Alanje   is a corregimiento in Alanje District, Chiriquí Province, Panama. It is the seat of Alanje District. Its population as of 1990 was 2,348; its population as of 2000 was 2,703.

References

Corregimientos of Chiriquí Province